Pseudathyma plutonica is a butterfly in the family Nymphalidae. It is found in the Democratic Republic of the Congo, Uganda, Kenya and Tanzania. The habitat consists of forests.

Adults are attracted to fermenting fruit.

Subspecies
Pseudathyma plutonica plutonica (Democratic Republic of the Congo: Lualaba, Uganda, western Kenya, north-western Tanzania)
Pseudathyma plutonica expansa Kielland, 1978 (Tanzania)
Pseudathyma plutonica shaba Chovet, 2002 (Democratic Republic of the Congo)

References

Butterflies described in 1902
Pseudathyma